Hohenacker, once a town, is now part of Waiblingen, Baden-Württemberg, Germany.

Towns in Baden-Württemberg